Ghost Warrior, Lozen of the Apaches is a 2002 historical novel by Lucia St. Clair Robson.  This novel was the runner-up for the Golden Spur Award in 2002.

Plot summary
The Chiricahua Apache chief, Victorio, called his sister Lozen his wise counselor and his right hand. He said she had the strength of a man and was a shield to her people. Even in a society possessing extraordinary courage, endurance and skill, she was unique. The Apaches believe that when she was young, the spirits blessed her with horse magic, the gift of healing and the power to see enemies at a distance. In the Apaches' 30-year struggle to defend their homeland, they came to rely on her strength, wisdom, and supernatural abilities.

Because of her gift of far-sight, she was the only unmarried woman allowed to ride with the warriors and fight alongside them. After her beloved brother Victorio's death, she joined Geronimo's band of insurgents. With Geronimo and fifteen other warriors, she resisted the combined forces of the United States and Mexican armies, and the heavily armed civilian populations of New Mexico and Arizona Territories. She and the sixteen warriors, and seventeen women and children held out against a total of about nine thousand men.

References

External links
 Ghost Warrior at Lucia St. Clair Robson's website

2002 American novels
American historical novels
Western (genre) novels
Novels by Lucia St. Clair Robson
Southwestern United States in fiction
Biographical novels
Books about Native Americans
Forge Books books